The Società Geografica Italiana formed as a geographic society in 1867 in Florence, Italy, and moved to Rome in 1872. As of 1924 it operated from headquarters in Villa Mattei in the Celio rione. The society began publishing a journal in 1868, and also sponsored scientific expeditions, such as one to Ethiopia in 1876, led by Orazio Antinori. In 1892 its members were among the first participants of the triennial .

Presidents of the society
 Cristoforo Negri, 1867-1872
 Cesare Correnti, 1873-1879
 Onorato Caetani, 1879-1887
 Francesco Nobili Vitelleschi, 1887-1891
 Giacomo Doria, 1891-1900
 , 1900-1906
 Antonino di San Giuliano, 1906
 Raffaele Cappelli, 1907-1915
 Scipione Borghese, 1916-1921
 Paolo Thaon di Revel, 1921-1923
 Luigi Federzoni, 1923-1926
 Pietro Lanza di Scalea, 1926-1928
 , 1928-1932
 Corrado Zoli, 1933-1944
 , 1944-1945
 , 1945-1955
 Giovanni Boaga, 1955-1961
 Riccardo Riccardi, 1962-1969
 Ferdinando Gribaudi, 1969-1971
 , 1971-1977
 Ernesto Massi, 1978-1987
 Gaetano Ferro, 1987-1997
 , 1997-2013
 Sergio Conti, 2013-2015       
 , 2015–present

See also
  (library)

References

 This article incorporates information from the Italian Wikipedia.

Bibliography

Issued by the society 
  1868-

About the society

Images

External links

 Official site
 Società Geografica Italiana. Photo Archive (official site)
 

1867 establishments in Italy
Geographic societies
Rome R. XIX Celio
Organizations established in 1867
Learned societies of Italy